Jersey Devil is the sixth studio album by American musician Matt Mondanile under his pseudonym Ducktails. It was released on October 6, 2017 through New Images.

Track listing

References

2017 albums
Ducktails (band) albums